Ciril Praček (March 27, 1913 – October 25, 2000) was a Slovenian alpine skier who competed for the Kingdom of Yugoslavia in the 1936 Winter Olympics and for the SFR of Yugoslavia in the 1948 Winter Olympics. He was born in Jesenice. In 1936 he finished 15th in the alpine skiing combined event.

External links
Alpine skiing 1936 
Biography of Ciril Praček 

1913 births
2000 deaths
Sportspeople from Jesenice, Jesenice
Slovenian male alpine skiers
Yugoslav male alpine skiers
Olympic alpine skiers of Yugoslavia
Alpine skiers at the 1936 Winter Olympics
Alpine skiers at the 1948 Winter Olympics